With a height of , Maderas is the smaller of the two volcanoes which make up the island of Ometepe, situated in Lake Nicaragua in Nicaragua, Central America.  Unlike Concepción, the other volcano on the island, Maderas has not been active in historical times. Its crater contains a crater lake.

The slopes of Maderas are one of the few places on the Pacific side of Nicaragua where cloud forest grows. The only other place where this is found is at the Mombacho volcano. Cloud forests are characterized by a rich plant and animal life, made possible by the high levels of humidity in the climate. Prehistoric petroglyphs have been found at the Maderas volcano.

Climbing to the top of the volcano is a popular tourist activity. Tourists are strongly encouraged by local guiding companies to hire a guide, but the trail from the common starting point at Finca Magdalena is obvious the entire way to the top. The hike to the top of the crater can be difficult, with steep inclines that get muddy when it rains. It rains often on Ometepe Island, so a slippery climb is likely, even in the dry season. The round trip hike takes between 6 and 9 hours and changes from dry forest to humid forest to cloud forest.

There are a number of species that dwell on the volcano, including the white-faced monkey, mountain crab, howler monkeys, and a number of butterflies including the blue morphos.

See also
 List of volcanoes in Nicaragua

References

External links 

 Climbing the Maderas Volcano
 Ometepe Island Info - Volcán Maderas

Mountains of Nicaragua
Stratovolcanoes of Nicaragua
Volcanic crater lakes
Rivas Department
Inactive volcanoes
Pleistocene stratovolcanoes
First 100 IUGS Geological Heritage Sites